Nueve de Julio (or 9 de Julio) means July 9 in Spanish. It may refer to:
 
 The date of the Argentine Declaration of Independence
 One of the following cities and towns in Argentina:
 Nueve de Julio, Buenos Aires Province
 Nueve de Julio, Corrientes
 Nueve de Julio, Misiones
 Nueve de Julio, San Juan
 9 de Julio Avenue in Buenos Aires City
 Nueve de Julio District, Peru
 Protected Cruiser Nueve de Julio (1892), a former cruiser in the Argentine Navy
 ARA Nueve de Julio (C-5), a former cruiser in the Argentine Navy

See also 
 Nueve de Julio Partido, Buenos Aires
 Nueve de Julio Department (disambiguation), several national subdivisions in Argentina